John T. Ward (1862 – August 2, 1899) was a Major League Baseball pitcher who played for one season. He pitched in one game for the Providence Grays on September 19 during the 1885 Providence Grays season.

External links

Major League Baseball pitchers
Providence Grays players
1862 births
1899 deaths
19th-century baseball players
Sportspeople from East St. Louis, Illinois
Baseball players from Illinois